Caryn Michelle Ward Ross (née Ward) is an American actress, dancer, choreographer and producer.

Life and career
Ward was born in Los Angeles, California, Ward's mother is a lawyer and her father is a medical doctor. She attended
Howard University where she graduated with a degree in psychology. Ward also studied dance at Alvin Ailey American Dance Theater in New York City. She performed with various artists including Janet Jackson, Arsenio Hall, and Rosie Perez.

Ward began her career as a child actor in the 1980s, appearing in a recurring role in the musical-dance drama series Fame from 1985 to 1986. She later appeared in Webster, Paradise and Family Matters. From 1990 to 1991, she co-starred in the short-lived CBS sitcom You Take the Kids, starring Nell Carter. Ward later took ten year-break from acting and in 2000s, began appearing in episodes of Friends, Strong Medicine, The Shield, and Lincoln Heights. In 2004, she made her movie debut appearing in an supporting role in the thriller Motives, opposite Vivica A. Fox and Shemar Moore. She later appeared in several featuring films, including Boss'n Up (2005), Traci Townsend (2006), and N-Secure (2009). From 2006 to 2015, she had a recurring role in the CW/BET comedy series, The Game.

Ward starred and produced films The Affair (2014) and Zodiac Sign (2015). She starred in the short-lived Bounce TV sitcom Grown Folks in 2017, which was canceled after 13 episodes. In 2018, she received Indie Series Awards nomination for her performance in the Victoria Rowell comedy series The Rich and the Ruthless. Later in 2018, she so-created alongside her husband Craig Ross Jr., starred and produced Urban Movie Channel drama series Monogamy.

Personal life
On June 26, 2011, Caryn Ward married television and film director Craig Ross, Jr.

Filmography

Film

Television

References

External links
 
 

Actresses from Los Angeles
African-American actresses
American film actresses
American television actresses
Howard University alumni
American female dancers
Dancers from California
African-American female dancers
African-American dancers
Living people
Year of birth missing (living people)
21st-century African-American people
21st-century African-American women